Ho Kham may refer to two administrative units, covering the same area

Ho Kham subdistrict
Ho Kham municipality